Caporal may refer to:

Caporal, a type of strong dark tobacco
Caporales,  a Bolivian dance
Caporal (military rank) in French, equivalent to Corporal
Kaporal, Angolan footballer